Anatoliy Kasyanenko was a Ukrainian politician and diplomat. From 1997 to 1998 he headed state agency that is in charge of tourism in Ukraine. He died in 2021.

External links
 Anatoliy Kasianenko at the Official Ukraine Today portal
 Пiшoв з життя п'ятий губepнaтop Xepcoнщини

1942 births
2021 deaths
Diplomats from Tbilisi
Kyiv Higher Party School alumni
Komsomol of Ukraine members
First convocation members of the Verkhovna Rada
Tourism in Ukraine
Governors of Kherson Oblast
Ambassadors of Ukraine to Georgia (country)
Ambassadors of Ukraine to Uzbekistan
Ambassadors of Ukraine to Tajikistan
Ambassadors of Ukraine to Afghanistan
Communist Party of Ukraine (Soviet Union) politicians